Tiverton was a constituency located in Tiverton in east Devon, formerly represented in the House of Commons of the Parliament of the United Kingdom. Enfranchised as a parliamentary borough in 1615 and first represented in 1621, it elected two Members of Parliament (MPs) by the first past the post system of election until 1885. The name was then transferred to a county constituency electing one MP. (Between 1885 and 1918, the constituency was alternatively called Devon, North East.)

In 1997, it was merged with the neighbouring constituency of Honiton to form the Tiverton and Honiton constituency.

Prime Minister Lord Palmerston was a former MP for the seat.


History

Boundaries
1885–1918: The Municipal Borough of Tiverton, and the Sessional Divisions of Cullompton and Wonford.

1918–1950: The Municipal Borough of Tiverton, the Urban Districts of Bampton and Dawlish, the Rural Districts of Oulmstock and Tiverton, and parts of the Rural Districts of Newton Abbot and St Thomas.

1950–1974: The Municipal Borough of Tiverton, the Urban Districts of Dawlish and Teignmouth, the Rural District of Tiverton, and part of the Rural District of St Thomas.

1974–1983: The Municipal Borough of Tiverton, the Urban Districts of Crediton, Dawlish, and Teignmouth, the Rural Districts of Crediton and Tiverton, and part of the Rural District of St Thomas.

1983–1997: The District of Mid Devon wards of Boniface, Bradninch, Cadbury, Canal, Canonsleigh, Castle, Clare, Cullompton Outer, Cullompton Town, Culm, East Creedy, Halberton, Lawrence, Lowman, Newbrooke, Paullet, Sandford, Shuttern, Silverton, Upper Culm, Upper Yeo, Westexe North, Westexe South, Willand, and Yeo, and the District of East Devon wards of Broadclyst, Clystbeare, Clyst Valley, Exe Valley, Ottery St Mary Rural, Ottery St Mary Town, and Tale Vale.

Members of Parliament

Tiverton borough, 1621–1885

County constituency, 1885–1997

Election results

Elections in the 1830s

Kennedy's election was declared void on petition, causing a by-election.

Kennedy resigned, causing a by-election.

Elections in the 1840s

Palmerston was appointed Secretary of State for Foreign Affairs, requiring a by-election.

Elections in the 1850s

Palmerston was appointed Home Secretary, requiring a by-election.

Palmerston became Prime Minister and First Lord of the Treasury, requiring a by-election.

Palmerston became Prime Minister and First Lord of the Treasury, requiring a by-election.

Elections in the 1860s
Temple was appointed Constable of Dover Castle and Lord Warden of the Cinque Ports, requiring a by-election.

 
 

Lord Palmerston's death in October 1865 caused a by-election.

Elections in the 1870s
Denman resigned after being appointed a Judge of Court of Common Pleas.

Elections in the 1880s 

 

Massey's death caused a by-election.

 

Representation was reduced to one member.

Walrond was appointed a Lord Commissioner of the Treasury, requiring a by-election.

Elections in the 1890s

Elections in the 1900s

Elections in the 1910s 

General Election 1914–15:

Another General Election was required to take place before the end of 1915. The political parties had been making preparations for an election to take place and by the July 1914, the following candidates had been selected; 
Unionist: Lionel Walrond
Liberal:

Elections in the 1920s 

8

Elections in the 1930s

Elections in the 1940s 
General Election 1939–40:
Another General Election was required to take place before the end of 1940. The political parties had been making preparations for an election to take place from 1939 and by the end of this year, the following candidates had been selected; 
Conservative: Gilbert Acland-Troyte 
Independent Progressive: Michael Pinney

Elections in the 1950s

Elections in the 1960s

Elections in the 1970s

Elections in the 1980s

Elections in the 1990s

See also
 List of parliamentary constituencies in Devon

Notes and references

Sources 
Robert Beatson, A Chronological Register of Both Houses of Parliament (London: Longman, Hurst, Res & Orme, 1807) 
D Brunton & D H Pennington, Members of the Long Parliament (London: George Allen & Unwin, 1954)
Cobbett's Parliamentary history of England, from the Norman Conquest in 1066 to the year 1803 (London: Thomas Hansard, 1808) 
F W S Craig, British Parliamentary Election Results 1832-1885 (2nd edition, Aldershot: Parliamentary Research Services, 1989)
 Henry Stooks Smith, The Parliaments of England from 1715 to 1847, Volume 1 (London: Simpkin, Marshall & Co, 1844)  
 

Tiverton, Devon
Parliamentary constituencies in Devon (historic)
Constituencies of the Parliament of the United Kingdom established in 1615
Constituencies of the Parliament of the United Kingdom disestablished in 1997
Constituencies of the Parliament of the United Kingdom represented by a sitting Prime Minister